The Rigi–Scheidegg railway (RSB) is a former railway line built high on the Rigi massif on the cantonal border between Lucerne and Schwyz in Switzerland.

Even before the Vitznau–Rigi rack railway was opened in 1871, the Rigi Massif was a major tourist attraction, with a number of grand hotels occupying various locations on the massif. One of these was at the summit of the Scheidegg peak, which was not served by either the Vitznau–Rigi line or the Arth–Rigi rack railway that followed it. In order to provide easier access for its guests, the Rigi–Scheidegg railway was built to provide a link to Rigi Kaltbad on the Vitznau–Rigi line. The line opened in two stages, with the stage from Kaltbad to First opening on the 14 July 1874, and the section from First to Scheiddegg on the 1 June 1875.

Unlike the Vitznau–Rigi line, the Rigi–Scheidegg railway followed the contours near the top of the mountain, rather than climbing it, and was not a rack railway. Instead, the two lines met at right angles, and provision was made for the transfer of passengers and goods. Although three steam locomotives were built by Swiss Locomotive and Machine Works (SLM) for the opening of the line, two were found sufficient to operate it, so the third sold to an unknown purchaser in 1884.

With the outbreak of World War I in 1914, the tourist industry collapsed and never recovered in the same form. When tourists did return to the mountains, they came as day trippers, meaning that the mountain-top hotels were no longer needed. That hit the Rigi–Scheidegg railway particularly hard, and the line closed on the 21 September 1931, never to reopen. The track was removed in 1942, and the line's two remaining steam locomotives were scrapped. Two of the line's passenger cars survive alongside the trackbed, converted into holiday homes, but all the buildings of the line have been demolished.

Gallery

References

Bibliography 

 

Closed railway lines in Switzerland
Metre gauge railways in Switzerland
Railway lines opened in 1874
Railway lines closed in 1931